The kwacha (ISO 4217: MWK, official name Malawi Kwacha) is the currency of Malawi as of 1971, replacing the Malawian pound. It is divided into 100 tambala. The kwacha replaced other types of currency, namely the British pound sterling, the South African rand, and the Rhodesian dollar, that had previously circulated through the Malawian economy. The exchange rate of the kwacha undergoes fixed periodical adjustments, but since 1994 the exchange rate has floated. In 2005, administrative measures were put in place by Bingu wa Mutharika to peg the exchange rate with other currencies. Banknotes are issued by the Reserve Bank of Malawi. In May 2012, the Reserve Bank of Malawi devalued the kwacha by 34% and unpegged it from the United States dollar.

Etymology

The name kwacha was first used in Zambia, where the Zambian kwacha was introduced in 1968. It derives from the Chinyanja or Chichewa word meaning "it has dawned", while tambala translates as "rooster" in Chichewa. The tambala was so named because a hundred roosters announce the dawn.

History

The kwacha replaced the Malawian pound in 1971 at a rate of two kwacha to one pound.

 one British pound sterling was equal to approximately 883.43 kwachas, one US dollar was equal to 725.16 kwachas and one South African rand was equal to 47.69 kwachas.  one Euro is equivalent to 797.42 Kwachas.

Coins

The first coins introduced in 1971 were in denominations of 1, 2, 5, 10 and 20 tambala. In 1986, 50 tambala and 1 kwacha coins were also introduced. In January 2007, 5 and 10 kwacha coins, which actually bear a mint date of 2006, were also released into circulation. On 23 May 2012 new 1, 5 and 10 kwacha coins were released into circulation

The 1 and 2 tambala coins are composed of copper-plated steel. The 5 tambala coin is of nickel-plated steel. The 50 tambala and 1 kwacha coin are composed of brass-plated steel.

Banknotes

In 1971, banknotes dated 1964 were introduced in denominations of 50 tambala, 1, 2 and 10 kwacha. 5 kwacha notes were introduced in 1973 when the 2 kwacha note was discontinued. 20 kwacha notes were introduced in 1983. 50 tambala notes were last issued in 1986, with the last 1 kwacha notes printed in 1992. In 1993, 50 kwacha notes were introduced, followed by 100 kwacha in 1993, 200 kwacha in 1995, 500 kwacha in 2001 and 2000 kwacha in November 2016 to ease desperate cash shortages.

As of 2008, the following banknote denominations are in circulation:

According to an article in the Nyasa Times dated 9 March 2012, within the next six months the Reserve Bank of Malawi would introduce a whole new series of notes, including a 1,000-kwacha note, twice the largest denomination currently in circulation. The notes were announced in Biantyre on 8 March by Governor Dr. Perks Ligoya. The new notes would be much smaller in size than the current notes, which served as a cost-cutting measure. The new 1,000-kwacha note was going to be printed by De La Rue.

On 23 May 2012, the Nyasa Times reported that the Reserve Bank of Malawi introduced the new 1,000 kwacha note into circulation along with the proposed new notes. The new 1,000 kwacha note was valued at around US$4. The new kwacha had the face of the first president Kamuzu Banda on the front and the back carries a depiction of Mzuzu maize silos.

The new 20 kwacha note was found to contain an error. On the back of the note is a building identified as the Domasi Teacher's Training College (now known as the Domasi College of Education). However, it is reported that the building is, in fact, the Machinga Teacher's Training College.

The Reserve Bank of Malawi is going to revise its new family of notes so that they are more "blind friendly". According to the Malawi Union of the Blind, the current notes have raised dots to aid in recognition of the denominations, but the dots are too small to be useful.

See also
 Economy of Malawi
 Zambian kwacha

References

Circulating currencies
Currencies of Africa
Currencies of the Commonwealth of Nations
Currencies of Malawi
Currencies introduced in 1971